The British Rail Class 06 is a class of 0-4-0 diesel-mechanical shunters built by Andrew Barclay Sons and Company from 1958 to 1960 for use on the Scottish Region of British Railways. They were originally numbered D2410–D2444 and later given the TOPS numbers 06001–06010.

Technical details
The engine is a Gardner 8-cylinder 4 stroke "8L3" connected to a Wilson-Drewry CA5 5-speed epicyclic gearbox with a Vulcan-Sinclair type 23 fluid coupling and a Wiseman type 15 RLGB gearbox.

While all technically similar, the locomotives had two different designs for the back of the cab, the first 15 locomotives having three windows, the remaining 20, having two.

Numbering
They were originally numbered D2410–D2444. The ten still in service in January 1973, nos. D2413/14/20–23/26/37/40/44, were given the TOPS numbers 06001–06010.

Withdrawal
With a decline in shunting, BR was forced to reduce its shunter fleet in the 1960s and 70s, resulting in mass withdrawals. The first class 06 locomotive to be withdrawn was D2441 in March 1967 and the last was 06002 (formerly D2414) in September 1981.

Preservation

A single locomotive survives, number 06003 (formerly D2420). It was the second last locomotive of the class in service when it was withdrawn in February 1981. It was transferred to the departmental fleet following withdrawal and renumbered 97804, and used at the Reading Signal Works where it replaced 97020. After being withdrawn again in 1984, it was sold to Booth's scrapyard in Rotherham (date unknown) before being saved for preservation by the local South Yorkshire Railway based at Meadowhall in Sheffield. Later owned by HNRC and visited several locations before been stored at the Museum of Science and Industry, Liverpool Road, Manchester, and in 2013 was moved into the Heritage Shunters Trust collection at Peak Rail, Rowsley.

One locomotive, D2432, was sold to P. Wood Shipbreakers of Queenborough, Kent in 1969. It was exported to Italy in 1977, but its subsequent fate is unrecorded.

Model Railways
In 1963 Hornby Railways launched its first version of the BR Class 06 in OO gauge. Since 2011 Hornby have produced a basic representation of the prototype as part of their Railroad range in BR Blue, whilst past examples have carried a variety of liveries.

An etched brass kit of the 06 is in the range of Judith Edge Kits.

References

Further reading

External links
   Image of 06005 at Dundee in 1980

06
Andrew Barclay locomotives
B locomotives
Railway locomotives introduced in 1958
Standard gauge locomotives of Great Britain